is a genre of  light novels, manga, anime, hentai, and video games originating in Japan in the 1970s but exploding late 1980s and 1990s with dating simulator games and focused on polygynous or polyandrous relationships, where a protagonist is surrounded by three or more androphilic/gynephilic suitors, love interests and/or sexual partners. Harem works are frequently comedies that rely on self-insertion protagonists allowing the audience to project themselves unto, and on having relatable and interesting ensemble cast of characters. Although originating in Japan, the genre later inspired variants in Western media.

Structure
A harem structure is ambiguous. The most distinguishable trait is the group of polyamorous females or males who accompany the protagonist and, in some instances, live with the protagonist. Intimacy is customary but never necessary.

Key characteristics 
Typically, harem fiction fixes on key characteristics.  

First, the main protagonist, typically an everyman-archetype, has very little characterization other than being nice, reacting passively to their surroundings.  This can let the readers insert themselves in the character’s stead or develop sympathy for the character.

Secondly, all the protagonist's love interests have low self-esteem, falling for the main character because of their nice personality and kindness.  The main character often spends time with them just to see their efforts to prove themselves to him.

"Reverse"
A reverse harem is the gender opposite of a "straight"-harem, wherein a harem is directed towards male protagonists with women and/or gay men courting the protagonist. In a reverse harem, it focuses on female protagonists who are being courted by males and/or lesbians, usually seven or more.

Ending
Harem endings typically follow two different routes, the main character ends up with one or more of the women. Occasionally, a "harem ending" occurs where the main protagonist ends with all of the women, but this is more common in works intended for older audiences.

Homogeneity
Harem is considered to be one of the most traditional genres of anime and manga in respect to depicted sexual relationships, as most are heterosexual. However, this condition is not mandatory, and work in the genre can contain characters of various gender identities or sexualities. "Reverse harems" garner popularity, as they sometimes have the harem's genders mixed up without regard for the protagonist's sex or gender.

Thus, harem work in the genres of boys love or girls love is not something impossible, although they are much less common than the classic heterosexual examples.

Criticism 
Harem anime has come under criticism for a multitude of reasons.  

First, it promotes a false expectation of relationships, claiming that being nice will kickstart a relationship with someone, and eventually, the love interest will demonstrate their affection for the protagonist. Often, real-life relationships require active participation from both parties, and waiting for the love interest to make the first move can lead to complaints about being "friend zoned".

Secondly, the way female characters are written draws criticism and controversy. Female characters, especially, are written with a singular goal to get with the main protagonist, often sexualized for the reader’s satisfaction, and any character development is put off to the side in order to advance the plot. In real life, women have social lives and other friends, participating in social events with multiple people.

As such, it can lead impressionable male readers to react negatively to being rejected by women when they follow the harem anime route in order to build a romantic relationship.

See also
List of harem anime and manga

References

Further reading
 
 

 
Anime and manga genres
Anime and manga terminology